Santa was a Spanish heavy metal / hard rock band founded in 1983 in Madrid.

Career 
The group started when Fernando Sánchez and Juan Luis Serrano, (both of Obús), approached singer Azuzena Dorado after they saw a gig of her band, Huracán, in 1983. 
They then called guitarist Jero Ramiro (from Ñu) and recorded a demo for Chapa Discos in 1983 (as "Viuda Negra"). 
Right before recording their first album they decided to change their name to Santa, as Fernando Sánchez and Juan Luis Serrano left the band and were replaced by Bernardo Ballester and Julio Díaz.

This line-up recorded Reencarnación, their first album released in 1984

After the second LP No hay piedad para los condenados was released, in 1985, vocalist Azuzena Dorado left the band.
Argentine singer Leonor Marchesi (from the band Púrpura) joined Santa to record an album, entitled Templario, featuring a more melodic/AOR sound which sold quite poorly.

After a show in 1987 the band decided to call it quits.

Discography 
 Reencarnación (1984)
 No hay piedad para los condenados (1985)
 Templario (1986)

References

Spanish musical groups
Spanish heavy metal musical groups
Musical groups established in 1983
Musical groups disestablished in 1987